Toppu Dam  is a gravity dam located in Hokkaido Prefecture in Japan. The dam is used for flood control, irrigation and water supply. The catchment area of the dam is 65.3 km2. The dam impounds about 159  ha of land when full and can store 36000 thousand cubic meters of water. The construction of the dam was started on 1979 and completed in 2013.

References

Dams in Hokkaido